Sarband is a village in Emamzadeh Seyyed Mahmud Rural District, Sardasht District, Dezful County, Khuzestan Province, Iran. Its population was not reported in the 2006 census.

References 

Populated places in Dezful County